Little Italy, West Virginia may refer to the following places in the U.S. state of West Virginia:
Little Italy, Clay County, West Virginia
Little Italy, Randolph County, West Virginia